Ottumwa is a city in and the county seat of Wapello County, Iowa, United States. The population was 25,529 at the time of the 2020 U.S. Census. Located in the state's southeastern section, the city is split into northern and southern halves by the Des Moines River. Ottumwa serves as a major economic, commercial, and cultural hub for the Southeastern Iowa region.

Etymology
The city's name derives from Native American Sac and Fox, alternatively Meskwaki, language. The English language translation is generally presumed to refer to the Appanoose Rapids of the Des Moines River, as "tumbling waters" or similar. Earlier versions of the name were suffixed by the Sac word for place, noc.

Alternative translations of the Native American name include:
Place of Perseverance or Self will
Place of Hermits
Place of the lone chief

History

In May 1843, several investors formed the Appanoose Rapids Company and staked claim to 467 acres of land in the present site of Ottumwa. Their colonization involved claiming land supporting three indigenous settlements. The first official cabin was built in May 1843 after the area was opened to settlement (an earlier cabin built in defiance of this date was destroyed by Army troops at that time). The original platt was titled Louis Ville. In 1844 the city was named as the county seat.

The town was severely damaged during the flood of 1851.

In 1857, coal was being mined from the McCready bank, a site along Bear Creek four miles west of Ottumwa. In 1868, Brown and Godfrey opened a drift mine four miles northwest of town. By 1872, Brown and Godfrey employed 300 men and had an annual production of 77,000 tons. In 1880, the Phillips Coal and Mining Company opened a mine two miles northwest of town. In subsequent years, they opened 5 more shafts in the Phillips and Rutledge neighborhoods, just north of Ottumwa. By 1889, the state mine inspector's report listed 15 mine shafts in Ottumwa. In 1914, the Phillips Fuel Company produced over 100,000 tons of coal, ranking among the top 24 coal producers in the state. Coal mining was so important to the local economy that, from 1890 to 1892, the Coal Palace was erected in Ottumwa as an exhibition center.

John Morrell & Company and their meat packing comples played a significant role in the development of Ottumwa from 1877 to 1973.

When the Burlington and Missouri River Railroad arrived in Ottumwa in September 1859, it ran parallel to the river channel. The availability of rail transportation encouraged both commercial and industrial expansion along the northwest to southeast axis. Access to the south bank of the river at first was by ferry from the foot of Green Street. By 1875 this ferry had been replaced by a bridge, and a number of additions had been made to the city during the first thirty years, all located on the north side of the Des Moines River. As development (almost exclusively residential) climbed the bluffs, the streets on top of the hills were laid out to compass points, rather than parallel to the river. Although there was some development on the south side of the river, South Ottumwa was not brought into the city limits until the 1880s.

Presidential visits
On five occasions a sitting U.S. president has visited the Bridge City:
 Benjamin Harrison was the first, in 1890, touring the Coal Palace and then speaking to a crowd of over 40,000 people.
 In 1903 President Theodore Roosevelt made a brief stop while on a train trip around America.
 President Harry Truman spent part of his 66th birthday, May 8, 1950, in Ottumwa while on a 16-state train trip in support of his Fair Deal program.
 In July 1971, President Richard Nixon arrived in Air Force One at the Ottumwa Industrial Airport on his way to dedicate the nearby Rathbun Lake dam and reservoir. It was a homecoming for Nixon of sorts, as he had been stationed at the Ottumwa airport while serving in the U.S. Navy during World War II.
 On April 27, 2010, President Barack Obama spoke to a large crowd at the Hellyer Student Center on the campus of Indian Hills Community College.

Geography
Ottumwa lies at N41.012917, W92.414817.

Northeastern Wapello County contains large deposits of coal, and there are also large deposits of clay in the region, which played an important role in the industrial development of Ottumwa.

Ottumwa is the center of the Ottumwa Micropolitan Statistical Area which includes all of Wapello County.

Climate

According to the Köppen Climate Classification system, Ottumwa has a hot-summer humid continental climate, abbreviated "Dfa" on climate maps.

Demographics

2010 census
As of the 2010 United States Census there were 25,023 people, 10,251 households, and 6,208 families in the city. The racial makeup of the city was 90.2% White, 4.06% Hispanic or Latino, 1.6% African American, 0.6% Native American, 0.9% Asian, 0.2% Pacific Islander, 4.5% from other races, and 1.8% from two or more races.

There were 10,251 households, of which 30.0% had children under the age of 18 living with them, 42.1% were married couples living together, 12.9% had a female householder with no husband present, 5.6% had a male householder with no wife present, and 39.4% were non-families. 32.9% of all households were made up of individuals, and 14.2% had someone living alone who was 65 years of age or older. The average household size was 2.36 and the average family size was 2.97.

The median age in the city was 37.4 years. 23.3% of residents were under the age of 18; 10.8% were between the ages of 18 and 24; 24.8% were from 25 to 44; 25% were from 45 to 64; and 16% were 65 years of age or older. The gender makeup of the city was 48.4% male and 51.6% female.

2000 census
As of the 2000 United States Census, there were 24,998 people, 10,383 households, and 6,530 families residing in the city. The racial makeup of the city was 95.33% White, 1.27% African American, 0.33% Native American, 0.78% Asian, 0.02% Pacific Islander, 1.38% from other races, and 0.89% from two or more races. Hispanic or Latino of any race were 2.76% of the population.

There were 10,383 households, out of which 28.1% had children under the age of 18 living with them, 47.8% were married couples living together, 11.3% had a female householder with no husband present, and 37.1% were non-families. 31.1% of all households were made up of individuals, and 14.8% had someone living alone who was 65 years of age or older. The average household size was 2.31 and the average family size was 2.88.

Age spread: 22.9% under the age of 18, 10.9% from 18 to 24, 26.1% from 25 to 44, 21.2% from 45 to 64, and 19.0% who were 65 years of age or older. The median age was 38 years. For every 100 females, there were 92.8 males. For every 100 females age 18 and over, there were 88.6 males.

The median income for a household in the city was $30,174, and the median income for a family was $37,302. Males had a median income of $31,222 versus $20,934 for females. The per capita income for the city was $16,040. About 10.9% of families and 15.2% of the population were below the poverty line, including 21.3% of those under age 18 and 8.2% of those age 65 or over.

Arts and culture

"Video Game Capital of the World"
As the home of Twin Galaxies, Ottumwa was proclaimed the "Video Game Capital of the World" by a mayoral decree issued on November 30, 1982, by Ottumwa Mayor Jerry Parker. The city's proclamation was recognized by U.S. Senator Charles Grassley. In connection with this proclamation, the city hosted the first North American Video Olympics in the fall of 1982. In 2009, the city council and chamber of commerce authorized a steering committee to plan out the International Video Game Hall of Fame museum, which, while not yet built, has inducted several video game industry professionals, developers and designers, and high-scoring players into the Hall of Fame.

In popular culture
 Owl City - In his song "The 5th of July", Adam Young mentions Ottumwa as the town in which he was born.
 Cpl. "Radar" O'Reilly – Company clerk from M*A*S*H television series and books was from Ottumwa, Iowa. 
 The movie The Tuskegee Airmen featured the character Hannibal "Iowa" Lee Jr. (played by Laurence Fishburne), who claimed Ottumwa as his hometown.
 The television movie The Woman Who Loved Elvis starring Roseanne Barr (then the wife of Ottumwa native Tom Arnold) was partially filmed in Ottumwa.

 In the sitcom Roseanne, Roseanne Conner's restaurant, the Lanford Lunch Box, was based on the Canteen Lunch in the Alley, in central downtown Ottumwa, which has been a stopping point for Ottumwans since the 1920s. Many famous patrons have been seen eating a "Canteen", a loose meat sandwich similar to a Maid-Rite.

Education

Public School System

The city of Ottumwa and the surrounding rural areas of Wapello County are served by the Ottumwa Community School District.

Ottumwa is served by Ottumwa High School, Evans Middle School, and then multiple neighborhood elementary schools that include Douma and Liberty on the Southern side of the city, while James, Horace Mann, Wilson, and Eisenhower serve the Northern side.

The Ottumwa School District mascot is the Bulldog. The Bulldog athletics participate in the Iowa Alliance Conference.

Higher education
Ottumwa is the home of Indian Hills Community College, a two-year community college. Between 1928 and 1980, it was also home to Ottumwa Heights College, a women's college that merged with Indian Hills in 1979 to create one institution. Indian Hills is located at the former Ottumwa Heights campus.

Buena Vista University also has a regional campus located on the Indian Hills campus.

Economy

Top employers
According to Ottumwa's 2020 Comprehensive Annual Financial Report, the top employers in the city were:

The Quincy Place Mall is a Shopping mall located in Ottumwa.

Media

Paired with Kirksville, Missouri, Ottumwa is a media market region, ranked #201 by Nielsen. Television stations include Fox/NBC/The CW+ affiliate KYOU-TV (channel 15) and K18GU-D (channel 12; translator of KIIN channel 12 in Iowa City). Dual ABC/CBS affiliate KTVO (channel 3) is licensed to and has its main offices near Kirksville, but has a second studio and news bureau in Ottumwa.

The Ottumwa Courier is the primary daily newspaper.

"Ottumwa Radio" is the primary regional radio provider with multiple stations.

Infrastructure

Transportation
Ottumwa Regional Airport is a general aviation airport owned by the City of Ottumwa and is operated by the Airport Advisory Board.

Amtrak, the national passenger rail system, provides service to the Ottumwa Amtrak station, operating its California Zephyr daily in both directions between Chicago, Illinois, and Emeryville, California, across the San Francisco Bay from San Francisco.

Ottumwa Transit Authority operates bus services throughout the Ottumwa area. The fixed-route system includes five routes and a shopping shuttle. It also operates a para-transit service known as Ottumwa Transit Authority Lift and Job Access Reverse Commute (JARC), a dial-a-ride service geared towards employees.
The five routes that operate Monday through Friday are: #1 North, #2 East West, #3 South Residential, #4 South Commercial, and #7 Airport. There are also two routes that operate on Saturday only; no routes operate on Sunday.

10–15 Regional Transit Agency provides a regional dial-a-ride service throughout Appanoose, Davis, Jefferson, Keokuk, Lucas, Mahaska, Monroe, Van Buren, Wapello and Wayne counties.

Currently, U.S. Route 34 and Iowa Highway 149 serve the town, replacing a former segment of U.S. Highway 63. Route 63 now bypasses the town as part of the Burlington to Des Moines expressway. The Jefferson Street Viaduct over the Des Moines River is listed on the National Register of Historic Places.

Railroads
The BNSF Railway has tracks through Ottumwa. This is a major corridor in the Chicago-Omaha line that is double track, and western coal makes up a large percentage of the freight carried on this line. The BNSF tracks travel under U.S. Highway 34, pass through the business district, under the U.S. Highway 63 bridge, cross the Iowa, Chicago and Eastern Railroad tracks at grade, exit Ottumwa, and later cross over the Des Moines River on their way to Albia, Iowa, and later Omaha, Nebraska.

The Iowa, Chicago and Eastern Railroad was acquired by the Canadian Pacific in 2008. Ottumwa is located on the Davenport, Iowa, to Kansas City, Mo. line and is a crew change point.

The Norfolk Southern Railway has trackage rights over the BNSF through Ottumwa.

Historic preservation
Ottumwa has many historic structures as well as several historic districts that are listed on the National Register. The city has an active Historic Preservation Commission that works to preserve some of the most important structures in the community since 1989. The following structures and districts are listed on the National Register of Historic Places.

Historic districts
 Historic Railroad District
 Fifth Street Bluff Historic District
 Ottumwa Cemetery
 Court Hill Historic District
 Vogel Place Historic District
 North Fellows Historic District

Historic structures
 First National Bank Building 1915
 Hotel Ottumwa
 Hoffman Building
 Benson Building 1930
 B'nai Jacob Synagogue
 Foster/Bell House
 Trinity Episcopal Church
 Benson Block
 Burlington Depot
 J.W. Garner Building
 Jay Funeral Home
 Jefferson Street Viaduct
 Ottumwa Public Library
 St. Mary of the Visitation Catholic Church
 Ottumwa City Hall
 Wapello County Courthouse
 Ottumwa Young Women's Christian Association

Notable people

 Tom Arnold – actor
 Chris Ash - head football coach, Rutgers University
 Steve Bales – Apollo 11 flight controller
 Jason Black, former professional mixed martial artist
 Stephen Blumberg – notorious rare book thief 
 Bud Clancy – major league baseball player
 Walter Day – video game statistician
 Edna Ferber – novelist who lived in Ottumwa as a child
 Elnora M. Gilfoyle – occupational therapist and educator.
 Donald Keyhoe – Marine Corps major and aviator, UFO researcher and author
 Dan Knight – jazz pianist, Steinway artist, composer, Pulitzer Prize nominee
 Bob Lee (baseball) – major league baseball pitcher
 Herschel Loveless (1911–1989) – 34th Governor of Iowa 1957–61, Mayor of Ottumwa 1949–53
 Emma Louise Lowe - musician, educator, former First Lady of American Samoa and former First Lady of Guam. Born in Ottumwa.
 E. J. Mather – college football and basketball player and coach. Born in Ottumwa.
 Mariannette Miller-Meeks – Iowa Congresswoman, U.S. House of Representatives. Long-time Ottumwa resident.
 Jack E. McCoy – Iowa state legislator 
 Arthur A. McGiverin – The longest-serving Chief Justice of the Iowa Supreme Court. Lived in Ottumwa for many years. Died in 2019 at the age of 90.
 R. W. Scott McLeod - U.S. Department of State official and Ambassador to Ireland; grew up in Ottumwa
 Karen Morley – actress and political activist; born as Mildred Linton, she was adopted and left Iowa for California with her family at age 13 
 Carol Morris – Miss Iowa USA 1956, Miss USA 1956, Miss Universe 1956, actress
 Honoré Willsie Morrow – author, editor
 Richard Nixon – former President of the United States lived in Ottumwa while he was stationed at the Ottumwa Naval Station (now decommissioned)
 Harry Ostdiek – Major League Baseball player 
 Beverley Owen – actress 
 Mary Florence Potts - iron inventor 
 J. R. Richards – musician/songwriter, author of "A Tribute to the American Farmer".
 Daniel F. Steck - U.S. Senator (1926-1931)
 Hal Walker (1896–1972) – film director
 Jake Weimer (1873–1928) – Major League Baseball player 1903–05
 Adam Young - singer-songwriter; founding member of Owl City 
 Zephyr (band) - lead singer Candy Givens - lived in Ottumwa as a child

Namesake
 The U.S. Navy harbor tug USS Ottumwa (YTB-761) was named for the city.
 A crater on Mars was named after the city.

References

External links

 Ottumwa portal style website City government, Health, Transit, Airport and more
 
 
 
 The Lost City of Ottumwa photo gallery on Picasa Web Albums
Ottumwa Courier Local newspaper online
 City Data Comprehensive Statistical Data and more about Ottumwa
 

 
Cities in Iowa
County seats in Iowa
Micropolitan areas of Iowa
Populated places established in 1843
Cities in Wapello County, Iowa
1843 establishments in Iowa Territory